It's Tough to Be a Bird is a 1969 American animated educational short film directed by Ward Kimball and produced by Walt Disney Productions. The short won the Academy Award for Best Short Subject, Cartoons in 1970 and was nominated for a BAFTA Film Award for Best Animated Film in 1971. This was the last animated short film produced by Disney to win an Academy Award until Paperman (2012) and thus the final animated cartoon short released by Disney in the golden age of American animation.

Summary
In the short, a red bird (voiced by Richard Bakalyan) explains how birds have contributed to human culture, even as people often try to kill them. He claims this may be because humans were jealous that birds can fly but people cannot, mentioning the legend of Icarus and featured films of early unsuccessful flying machines.

In Disney's D-TV in the 1980s, clips from this short were set to Bobby Day's cover of "Rockin' Robin".

Cast
 Ruth Buzzi as Soprano
 Richard Bakalyan as M.C. Bird
 John Emerson as Bird Fancier
 Jim Swain as Bird Fancier
 Ann Lord as Bird Fancier
 Hank Schloss as Bird Fancier
 Walter Perkins as Bird Fancier
 Rolf Darbo as Bird Fancier

See also
 List of American films of 1969
 Birdwatching
 National Audubon Society-featured in the film
 Hinkley, Ohio-featured in the film
 Noah's Ark

References

External links

 
 
 It's Tough To Be A Bird on BCDB

1969 films
Best Animated Short Academy Award winners
1960s Disney animated short films
Disney educational films
1969 animated films
Films directed by Ward Kimball
Films produced by Walt Disney
Films scored by George Bruns
Animated films about birds
Animated films about animals
Noah's Ark in film
1960s English-language films
Short films with live action and animation